Three warships of Sweden have been named Hajen, after Hajen:

 , a submarine launched in 1904 and stricken in 1922. 
 , a  launched in 1917 and stricken in 1943.
 , a  launched in 1954 and stricken in 1980.

Swedish Navy ship names